Terry Vaughn is a former American soccer referee.

Early life 
Terry was born in Mount Vernon, Iowa on 1 April 1973.

Career 
In 1987, Terry became a representative for the United States Soccer Federation. He continued to hold this position until 2012.

He became an international referee in 2003 and refereed matches of the MLS, as well as the 2009 and 2010 CONCACAF Champions League, the 2007 FIFA U-20 World Cup and the 2009 CONCACAF Gold Cup.

Diagnosed with Huntington's 
Terry was diagnosed with Huntington's disease, an inherited neurodegenerative disease in 2003. There is no known cure.

In 2011, the USSF dismissed Vaughn due to health issues.

A page on GoFundMe was founded to help Terry and his family pay medical bills by a fellow referee.

Legacy 
The Iowa Referee Academy has been renamed the Terry Vaughn Referee Academy in his honor.

References 

Living people
1973 births
American soccer referees